List of Guggenheim Fellowships awarded in 2001.

US and Canadian Fellows

 Geneive Abdo, Independent Scholar, Washington, D. C.; Senior Research Associate, Middle East Institute, Columbia University: Faith, power, and the new Iran.
 Jeremy Adelman, Professor of History, Princeton University: The political economy of revolution in South America, 1750–1824.
 Catherine J. Allen, Professor of Anthropology and International Affairs, George Washington University: Cultural patterning in Andean art.
 Fred Anderson, Associate Professor of History, University of Colorado at Boulder: Empire and liberty in North America, 1500–2000.
 Ray Anderson, Composer, Setauket, New York; Member of the Guest Faculty in Music, State University of New York at Stony Brook: Music composition.
 Tom Andrews, Poet, Athens, Greece; Member of the Faculty, MFA Program for Writers, Warren Wilson College: Poetry.
 Ann W. Astell, Professor of English, Purdue University: Medieval asceticism, mysticism, and aesthetics.
 Cristina Bacchilega, Professor of English, University of Hawaii at Manoa: Narrative and the politics of landmarks in Hawaii.
 Charlotte Bacon, Writer, Lee, New Hampshire; Assistant Professor of English, University of New Hampshire: Fiction.
 Claude Baker, Composer, Bloomington, Indiana; Professor of Music Composition, Indiana University Bloomington: Music composition.
 John A. Bargh, Professor of Psychology and Director, Graduate Program in Social Psychology, New York University: Nonconscious forms of self-regulation.
 James R. Bartholomew, Professor of Modern Japanese History, Ohio State University: Japan and the Nobel science prizes, 1901–1949.
 Harry William Bartnick, Artist, Beverly, Massachusetts; Associate Professor of Painting and Color Theory, New England School of Art and Design, Suffolk University: Painting.
 Frank D. Bean, Professor of Sociology and Director, Center for Research on Immigration, Population and Public Policy, University of California, Irvine: Multiracial identification and America's color lines.
 James J. Beatty, Associate Professor of Physics and of Astronomy and Astrophysics, Pennsylvania State University: Studies of the highest energy cosmic rays.
 Florence Bernault, Associate Professor of African History, University of Wisconsin–Madison: The invention of witchcraft in colonial and postcolonial Gabon.
 B. Douglas Bernheim, Lewis and Virginia Eaton Professor of Economics, Stanford University: The political economy of legislative institutions and policy formation.
 Jason Berry, Writer, New Orleans: A history of jazz funerals in New Orleans.
 Maggie Bickford, Associate Professor of History of Art and Architecture, Brown University: Auspicious visuality in China.
 Ralph Blumenthal, Writer, New York City; Arts and Culture News Reporter, The New York Times: The reforms of the Sing Sing warden Lewis E. Lawes.
 Christopher Boehm, Professor of Anthropology and Director, Jane Goodall Research Center, University of Southern California: The evolution of conflict resolution.
 Michele H. Bogart, Professor of Art History, State University of New York at Stony Brook: The Art Commission and public culture in New York City.
 Natalie Bookchin, New Media Artist, Los Angeles; Member of the Faculty, California Institute of the Arts: New media art.
 Kevin Boyle, Associate Professor of History, University of Massachusetts Amherst: The 1925 Sweet trials and the modern civil rights movement.
 Christopher Bram, Writer, New York City: Fiction.
 Martha Burgess, New Media Artist, Brooklyn, New York; Member of the Adjunct Faculty in Photography, Parsons School of Design, New School University: New media art.
 Charles Cajori, Artist, Watertown, Connecticut; Instructor in Art, New York Studio School of Drawing, Painting and Sculpture: Painting and drawing.
 Kathleen Cambor, Writer, Houston, Texas: Fiction.
 Ardis Cameron, Director of American and New England Studies, University of Southern Maine: Peyton Place as a social and cultural artifact.
 Alan Campion, Dow Chemical Company Professor of Chemistry and University Distinguished Teaching Professor, University of Texas at Austin: Spectroscopic studies of molecules adsorbed on solid surfaces.
 Jem Cohen, Film Maker, Brooklyn, New York: Film making.
 Cathy C. Cook, Film Maker, Brooklyn, New York; Visiting Assistant Professor of Film, Sarah Lawrence College: Film making.
 Marsha Cottrell, Artist, Brooklyn, New York: Drawing.
 John E. Crowley, George Munro Professor of History, Dalhousie University: Landscape art and Anglo-American identities in North America.
 Patricia Curd, Professor of Philosophy, Purdue University: A translation and study of Anaxagoras of Clazomenae.
 Gregory D'Alessio, Composer, Cleveland, Ohio; Assistant Professor of Music Composition, Cleveland State University: Music composition.
 Lynn Dally, Choreographer, Santa Monica, California; Artistic Director, Jazz Tap Ensemble, Los Angeles; Visiting Assistant Professor of World Arts and Cultures, University of California, Los Angeles: Choreography.
 Richard H. Davis, Associate Professor of Religion, Bard College: Processions in medieval South India.
 Marcel Detienne, Gildersleeve Professor of Classics, Johns Hopkins University: The gods of politics in early Greek cities.
 Tom D. Dillehay, Professor of Anthropology, University of Kentucky: History and the identity politics of the Chilean Mapuche.
 Bruce Randall Donald, Professor of Computer Science, Adjunct Professor of Chemistry and Edward and Joan Foley Fellow, Dartmouth College: Algorithms for structural proteomics.
 James Drake, Artist, Santa Fe, New Mexico: Visual art.
 Andre Dubus III, Writer, Newburyport, Massachusetts; Lecturer in English, Tufts University: Fiction.
 Marcia Lea Due, Photographer, Amenia, New York; Adjunct Assistant Professor of Photography, Purchase College, State University of New York: Photography.
 Thomas L. Dumm, Professor of Political Science, Amherst College: Loneliness and experience.
 Patricia Ebrey, Professor of History and International Studies, University of Washington: The Song emperor Huizong and his China.
 Geoff Eley, Sylvia Thrupp Collegiate Professor of Comparative History, University of Michigan: The German Right from Bismarck to the present.
 William F. Fagan, Assistant Professor of Biology, Arizona State University: The challenge of addressing key problems in conservation biology with weak data.
 Michael C. Ferris, Professor of Computer Sciences and Industrial Engineering, University of Wisconsin–Madison: Optimization for medical applications.
 Steve Fiffer, Writer, Evanston, Illinois: A biography of the spinal cord.
 Robbert Flick, Photographer, Claremont, California; Professor of Art, University of Southern California: Photography.
 John J. Flynn, MacArthur Curator of Geology, Field Museum and Associate Chairman, Committee on Evolutionary Biology, University of Chicago: The interplay of evolution and geologic change in South America.
 Nick Flynn, Poet, Provincetown, Massachusetts: Poetry.
 Mark N. Franklin, John R. Reitemeyer Professor of International Politics, Trinity College, Hartford: The voter turnout puzzle.
 Tom Franklin, Writer, Galesburg, Illinois; Visiting Writer-in-Residence, Knox College: Fiction.
 Victoria Funari, Film Maker, Vallejo, California: Film making.
 John Ganim, Professor of English, University of California, Riverside: Theories of the origins of medieval culture.
 Joe Gibbons, Film Maker, Malden, Massachusetts; Instructor in Film, School of the Museum of Fine Arts, Boston: Film making.
 Simon Gikandi, Robert Hayden Professor of English Language and Literature, University of Michigan: Pan-Africanism and culture, 1860–1960.
 Rebecca Gilman, Playwright, Chicago: Play writing.
 Judy Glantzman, Artist, New York City: Painting.
 Daniel S. Godfrey, Composer, Syracuse, New York; Professor of Music, Syracuse University: Music composition.
 Edwin Erle Sparks Professor of Spanish, Pennsylvania State University: The new sentimental novel in Spanish America.
 Deborah M. Gordon, Associate Professor of Biological Sciences, Stanford University: The organization of work in ant colonies.
 Joanne Greenbaum, Artist, New York City: Painting.
 Daniel A. Griffith, Professor of Geography, Syracuse University: Scientific visualization of spatial autocorrelation.
 Sally Gross, Choreographer, New York City: Choreography.
 Jessica Hagedorn, Writer, New York City: Fiction.
 Joseph Y. Halpern, Professor of Computer Science, Cornell University: Decision-making in complex systems.
 Rebecca Harris-Warrick, Associate Professor of Music, Cornell University: Dance in French opera during the ancien regime.
 Ehud Havazelet, Writer, Corvallis, Oregon; Associate Professor and Director, Program in Creative Writing, University of Oregon: Fiction.
 Christine Heindl, Artist, Chauncey, Ohio; Associate Professor of Art, Ohio University: Painting.
 Anne Higonnet, Associate Professor of Art History, Wellesley College: A history of private art museums, 1848–1940.
 David Hilliard, Photographer, West Roxbury, Massachusetts; Member of the Faculty in Photography, School of the Museum of Fine Arts, Boston: Photography.
 Marianne Hirsch, Professor of French and Comparative Literature, Dartmouth College: Czernowitz and the Holocaust.
 Philip T. Hoffman, Professor of History and Social Science, California Institute of Technology: The role of crises in economic and financial development (in collaboration with Jean-Laurent Rosenthal).
 Joseph Horowitz, Independent Scholar, New York City: Music and the Gilded Age.
 Jim Isermann, Artist, Santa Monica, California; Adjunct Professor of Art, Occidental College: Visual art.
 Anil Kumar Jain, University Distinguished Professor, Michigan State University: The structure of multidimensional patterns.
 Roberto Juarez, Artist, New York City: Painting.
 Mehran Kardar, Professor of Physics, Massachusetts Institute of Technology: Statistical physics and biological information.
 Ira Katznelson, Ruggles Professor of Political Science and History, Columbia University: Liberalism and the city.
 Webb Keane, Associate Professor of Anthropology, University of Michigan: Missionaries, Protestants, and dilemmas of "modernity" in Indonesia.
 J. Gerald Kennedy, William A. Read Professor of English, Louisiana State University: Literary nationalism in the age of Poe.
 Dale Vivienne Kent, Professor of History, University of California, Riverside: Patronage and patriarchy in early Medicean Florence.
 Todd Kontje, Professor of German and Comparative Literature, University of California, San Diego: German orientalisms.
 Daniel W. Koontz, Composer, Southampton, New York; Adjunct Associate Professor of Music, Southampton College: Music composition.
 Maryanne Kowaleski, Professor of History and Director, Center for Medieval Studies, Fordham University: An ethnography of maritime communities in medieval England.
 Matthew H. Kramer, Fellow and Director of Studies in Law, Churchill College and University Reader in Legal & Political Philosophy, University of Cambridge: An analysis of the ideal of negative liberty.
 Arthur J. Krener, Professor of Mathematics, University of California, Davis: Normal forms and bifurcation of control systems.
 Michael Kubovy, Professor of Psychology, University of Virginia: A new approach to human pleasure.
 Joan B. Landes, Professor of Women's Studies and History, Pennsylvania State University: Artificial life in 18th-century France.
 Dorianne Laux, Poet, Eugene, Oregon; Associate Professor of Creative Writing, University of Oregon: Poetry.
 Asunción Lavrin, Professor of History, Arizona State University: Masculinity and the religious orders in colonial Mexico.
 Jocelyn Lee, Photographer, Cape Elizabeth, Maine: Photography.
 Ricardo Llorca, Composer, New York City; Member of the Faculty, The Juilliard School; Member of the Faculty, Spanish Institute, New York: Music composition.
 Sharon Lockhart, Film Maker and Photographer, Los Angeles; Associate Professor of Photography, University of Southern California: Film making.
 Elizabeth Lunbeck, Associate Professor of History, Princeton University: Psychoanalytic practice in the United States before 1920.
 Eva Lundsager, Artist, New York City: Painting.
 Vera Lutter, Artist, New York City: Visual art.
 Stephen Malawista, Professor of Medicine, Yale University: Studies of chemotaxis in human blood plasma.
 Mark Maroncelli, Professor of Chemistry, Pennsylvania State University: Computational studies of supercritical fluids.
 Beverly McIver, Artist, Chandler, Arizona; Assistant Professor of Painting and Drawing, Arizona State University: Painting.
 Cindy McTee, Composer, Denton, Texas; Professor of Music Composition, University of North Texas: Music composition.
 Susan K. Mikota, Veterinarian, Sumatra, Indonesia; Consultant, World Wildlife Foundation, Indonesia: A program for Sumatran elephant healthcare and conservation.
 Susan L. Mizruchi, Professor of English and American Studies, Boston University: American culture, economy, and the novel, 1860–1915.
 Toril Moi, James B. Duke Professor of Literature and Romance Studies, Duke University: Ibsen's modernity.
 Dilip Mookherjee, Professor of Economics and Director, Institute of Economic Development, Boston University: Land reforms and fiscal decentralization in the economic development of West Bengal.
 Rachel Olivia Moore, Independent Scholar, New York City: A study of folklore on film.
 François M. Morel, Professor of Geosciences and Director, Princeton Environmental Institute, Princeton University: The biological chemistry of sea water.
 Brian Morton, Writer, New York City; Member of the Faculty in Writing, Sarah Lawrence College; Member of the Adjunct Faculty, Graduate Creative Writing Program, New York University: Fiction.
 John Mulvaney, Artist, Philadelphia: Painting.
 Nalini M. Nadkarni, Member of the Faculty in Tropical Biology, Evergreen State College: The communication of forest-canopy research to nonscientists.
 Marilyn Nelson, Poet, Storrs, Connecticut; Professor of English, University of Connecticut: Poetry.
 Herbert Neuberger, Professor I of Physics, Rutgers University: Chirality in nature.
 Richard E. Nisbett, Theodore M. Newcomb Distinguished University Professor of Psychology, University of Michigan: Eastern holism and Western analysis.
 Jacki Ochs (Bio), Film Maker, New York City; Assistant Professor of Film, Purchase College, State University of New York: Film making.
 Raymond J. O'Connor, Professor of Wildlife Ecology, University of Maine: The practice of ecology.
 Julio M. Ottino, R. R. McCormick Institute Professor and Walter P. Murphy Professor, Northwestern University: Dynamics and self-organization in granular media.
 George Packer, Member of the Core Faculty in Writing, Bennington College; Member of the Visiting Faculty in Writing, Sarah Lawrence College: The human face of globalization.
 Geoffrey Parker, Andreas Dorpalen Professor of History, Ohio State University: The world crisis, 1635–1665.
 Cliffton Peacock, Artist, Charleston, South Carolina; Associate Professor of Painting and Drawing, College of Charleston: Painting.
 Robert J. Penella, Professor of Classics, Fordham University: A study and translation of the orations of Himerius.
 Wyatt Prunty, Poet, Sewanee, Tennessee; Carlton Professor of English and Director, Sewanee Writers' Conference, University of the South: Poetry.
 Kevin Matthew Puts, Composer, Austin, Texas; Assistant Professor of Composition, University of Texas at Austin: Music composition.
 Ronald T. Raines, Professor of Biochemistry and Chemistry, University of Wisconsin–Madison: Automated protein assembly to mine the human genome.
 Sumathi Ramaswamy, Associate Professor of History, University of Michigan: Maps and modernity in India.
 Amy G. Remensnyder, Associate Professor of History, Brown University: Conquest, conversion, and the Virgin Mary in medieval Spain and Spanish colonial America.
 Joan L. Richards, Associate Professor of History, Brown University: Mathematics and spirit in the world of Augustus and Sophia DeMorgan.
 John Richardson, Contributing Editor, Vanity Fair; International Consultant in 20th Century Art, Dickinson Roundell, New York: A life of Picasso, 1917–1939.
 Katherine Wentworth Rinne, Associate Fellow, Institute for Advanced Technology in the Humanities, University of Virginia and Visiting Professor of Landscape Architecture, The Iowa State University: The waters of the city of Rome.
 David Rivard, Poet, Cambridge, Massachusetts; Lecturer in English, Tufts University: Poetry.
 Anne Charlotte M. Robertson, Film Maker, Framingham, Massachusetts: Film making.
 George D. Rose, Professor of Biophysics and Biophysical Chemistry, Johns Hopkins University: The physical basis of protein structure.
 Jean-Laurent Rosenthal, Professor of Economics, University of California, Los Angeles: The role of crises in economic and financial development (in collaboration with Philip T. Hoffman).
 Cynthia Rosenzweig, Senior Research Scientist, Earth Institute, Columbia University: The impacts of major systems of climate variability on world food security.
 Andrew Ross, Professor of American Studies, New York University: Work and play in the new economy.
 Janice L. Ross, Lecturer in Dance History, Stanford University: Anna Halprin and avant-garde dance.
 Margaret Russett, Associate Professor of English and Director of Undergraduate Studies, University of Southern California: Literature and abstraction in early 19th-century Britain.
 Marie-Laure Ryan (email), Independent Scholar, Bellvue, Colorado: Literary cartography.
 Joe Sacco, Comic-book Journalist, Sunnyside, New York: Comic-book journalism.
 Frederick Schauer, Frank Stanton Professor of the First Amendment and Academic Dean, John F. Kennedy School of Government, Harvard University: Generality and justice.
 Paul L. Schechter, William A. M. Burden Professor of Astrophysics, Massachusetts Institute of Technology: Studies in the microlensing of quasar lightcurves.
 Stephen A. Scheer, Photographer, Athens, Georgia; Associate Professor of Photography, University of Georgia: Photography.
 Hilary M. Schor, Professor of English and Gender Studies, University of Southern California: Women, fiction, and the subject of realism.
 Sarah Schulman, Playwright, New York City; Assistant Professor of English, City University of New York, College of Staten Island: Play writing.
 Freydoon Shahidi, Professor of Mathematics, Purdue University: New instances of functoriality.
 William Sheehan, Psychiatrist and Historian of Astronomy, Willmar, Minnesota: The structure and evolution of the galaxy.
 Shen Wei, Choreographer, New York City; Artistic Director, Shen Wei Dance Arts: Choreography.
 Daniel J. Sherman, Professor of French Studies and History, Rice University: The French and their "Others", 1945–1975.
 Amy Sillman, Artist, Brooklyn, New York; Visiting Assistant Professor of Painting, Bard College: Painting.
 Larry Silver, James and Nan Farquhar Professor of History of Art, University of Pennsylvania: The rise of visual genres in the Antwerp art market.
 Taryn Simon, Photographer, New York City: Photography.
 Yuri Slezkine, Professor of History, University of California, Berkeley: Moscow's house of government, 1928–1938.
 Bruce R. Smith, Professor of English, Georgetown University: Essays in historical phenomenology.
 Mike Smith, Photographer, Johnson City, Tennessee; Professor of Art, East Tennessee State University: Photography.
 Deborah Solomon, Writer, New York City: A biography of Norman Rockwell.
 Abigail Solomon-Godeau, Professor of History of Art and Architecture, University of California, Santa Barbara: Gender, genre, and the female nude in France.
 Lynette Spillman, Professor of Sociology, University of Notre Dame: Cultural dimensions of retail market exchange.
 Justin Spring, Writer and Scholar, New York City: A cultural history of Provincetown.
 Nancy Shatzman Steinhardt, Professor of East Asian Art and Curator of Chinese Art, University of Pennsylvania: Chinese architecture of the 4th to 6th centuries.
 Jeffrey Stock, Composer, Dix Hills, New York: Music composition.
 Richard S. Street, Photographer and Historian, San Anselmo, California: Photography and the farm-worker experience in California, 1850–2000.
 Donald M. G. Sutherland, Professor of History, University of Maryland, College Park: The French agricultural revolution, 1660–1914.
 Peter Temin, Elisha Gray II Professor of Economics, Massachusetts Institute of Technology: Market economy in the early Roman empire.
 Karen K. Uhlenbeck, Professor and Sid W. Richardson Foundation Regents Chair in Mathematics, University of Texas at Austin: A geometric approach to soliton and wave equations.
 Gunther Uhlmann, Professor of Mathematics, University of Washington: Inverse boundary problems.
 Dale J. Van Harlingen, Professor of Physics, University of Illinois at Urbana-Champaign: Phase coherence and dynamics in superconducting circuits.
 David T. Van Zanten, Professor of Art History, Northwestern University: The architect's contribution to the shaping of European cities in the 1840s and 1850s.
 Paul E. Walker, Visiting Scholar, Center for Middle Eastern Studies, University of Chicago: A study of the caliph al-Hakim.
 Richard A. Walker, Professor of Geography and Chairman, California Studies Center, University of California, Berkeley; Chairman, California Studies Association: The urban experience of San Francisco, 1950–2000.
 Jim C. H. Wang, Mabel D. Clark Distinguished Professor of Chemistry, University of Nebraska-Lincoln: Laser spectroscopy of polymeric liquids.
 Charles Harper Webb, Poet, Glendale, California; Professor of English, California State University, Long Beach: Poetry.
 Michael V. Wedin, Professor of Philosophy, University of California, Davis: Perception, change, and noncontradiction in Aristotle's Metaphysics.
 Monte Westerfield, Professor of Biology, University of Oregon: Mechanisms that regulate patterning of the anterior central nervous system.
 Alan Wiener, Artist, Brooklyn, New York: Sculpture.
 Ruth J. Williams, Professor of Mathematics, University of California, San Diego: Mathematical theory for stochastic networks.
 Kathleen Wilson, Associate Professor of History, State University of New York at Stony Brook: Theatre, culture, and modernity in the English provinces, 1720–1820.
 Leigh Witchel, Choreographer, New York City; Artistic Director, Dance as Ever: Choreography.
 Kazuo Yamaguchi, Professor of Sociology and Faculty Research Associate, Alfred P. Sloan Working Family Center, University of Chicago: Statistical and behavioral modeling of family processes.
 Susan Youens, Professor of Musicology, University of Notre Dame: The social history of the lied.
 Arlene Zallman, Composer, Wellesley, Massachusetts; Professor of Music Composition and Theory, Wellesley College: Music composition.
 Nadine Zanow, Artist, Boston; Assistant Professor of Studio Art, Brandeis University: Painting.

Latin American and Caribbean Fellows
 Ignacio Baca-Lobera, Composer, Querétaro, Mexico; Professor of Music Composition, Autonomous University of Querétaro: Music composition.
 Carlos L. Ballaré, Senior Research Scientist, National Research Council of Argentina (CONICET); Courtesy Associate Professor of Agronomy, University of Buenos Aires: Functional aspects of the impacts of solar ultraviolet radiation on plant-insect interactions.
 Graciela Lina Boente Boente, Professor of Mathematics, University of Buenos Aires; Independent Researcher, National Research Council of Argentina (CONICET): Robust and nonparametric inference.
 Alicia Borinsky, Writer, Newton, Massachusetts; Professor of Latin American and Comparative Literature, Boston University: Fiction.
 Alfredo Cáceres, Principal Investigator, National Research Council of Argentina (CONICET): Kinesin-like protein functions during neuronal polarization.
 Sergio Chejfec, Writer, Caracas, Venezuela; Editor-in-Chief, Nueva Sociedad, Caracas: Fiction.
 Eduardo Coutinho, Film Maker, Rio de Janeiro, Brazil; Consultant, Centro de Criação de Imagem Popular (CECIP), Rio de Janeiro: Film making.
 Christian Cravo, Photographer, Salvador, Bahia, Brazil: Photography.
 Leticia Fernanda Cugliandolo, Assistant Professor of Theoretical Physics, École Normale Supérieure, Paris, France: Quantum disordered systems and optimization problems.
 Gerardo Deniz (Juan Almela), Poet, Mexico City: Poetry.
 Javier A. Escobal, Senior Researcher, Grupo de Análisis para el Desarrollo (GRADE), Lima, Peru: The links between rural producers and markets.
 Alejandro Fainstein, Staff Researcher, Atomic Energy Commission and National Research Council of Argentina (CONICET); Assistant Professor of Physics, Instituto Balseiro, Bariloche, Argentina: Optically confined spectroscopy of nanostructures.
 Ana Fernández Garay, Associate Researcher, National Research Council of Argentina (CONICET); Professor of Linguistics, National University of La Pampa, Argentina: An edition of the testimonies of the last Ranquels.
 Sérgio T. Ferreira, Professor of Biochemistry, Federal University of Rio de Janeiro: Protein misfolding and aggregation in human amyloid diseases.
 Alberto Carlos Frasch, Researcher, National Research Council of Argentina (CONICET): Regulation of mucin expression in trypanosoma cruzi.
 Juan Eduardo García-Huidobro, Consultant and Professor, Ministry of Education, Santiago, Chile: Public policies to achieve equity in education.
 José Hernandez-Claire, Photographer, Guadalajara, Mexico; Curator, "Manuel Alvarez Bravo Gallery", University of Guadalajara: Photography.
 Hugo Hopenhayn, Professor of Economics, Universidad Torcuato Di Tella, Buenos Aires; Associate Professor of Economics, University of Rochester: Topics in social insurance.
 Ricardo Lanzarini, Artist, Montevideo, Uruguay: Drawing.
 Jorge Lauret, Assistant Professor of Mathematics, National University of Córdoba; Assistant Researcher, National Research Council of Argentina (CONICET): Studies in differential geometry.
 Annette Leibing, Anthropologist, Rio de Janeiro; Professor of Mental Health, Federal University of Rio de Janeiro: Aging and homelessness in Rio de Janeiro.
 Jac Leirner, Artist, São Paulo, Brazil: Visual art.
 Paula Luttringer, Photographer, Buenos Aires, Argentina; Assistant Director, Galatée Films, Argentina, Chile, and Peru: Photography.
 Jorge Macchi, Artist, Buenos Aires, Argentina: Visual art.
 Rachel Manley, Writer, Toronto, Canada: A biography of Edna Manley.
 Claudio Mercado Muñoz, Coordinator of Audiovisual Department, Chilean Museum of Pre-Columbian Art, Santiago: Bailes chinos and prehispanic memory in central Chile.
 Tomás Moulian Emparanza, Director, Instituto Formación Social Paulo Freire, Santiago, Chile: Intellectuals and politics in Chile, 1958–1970.
 Pablo E. Navarro, Professor of Philosophy of Law, Universidad Nacional del Sur, Bahía Blanca, Argentina; Researcher, National Research Council of Argentina (CONICET): Normative relevance and justification of institutional decisions.
 Hans W. Niemeyer Fernandez, Archaeologist, Santiago, Chile: The rock paintings of El Médano.
 Oscar Oiwa, Artist, Tokyo, Japan: Visual art.
 Pedro L. Oliveira, Associate Professor of Medical Biochemistry, Federal University of Rio de Janeiro: Biological defenses against heme toxicity.
 Alejandro César Olivieri, Professor of Analytical Chemistry, University of Rosario, Argentina; Research Fellow, National Research Council of Argentina (CONICET): The development of analytical methods for biomedical samples.
 Hilda Paredes, Composer, Mexico City and London: Music composition.
 Eduardo Antonio Parra, Writer, Mexico City: Fiction.
 Antonio Arnoni Prado, Professor of Literary Theory, State University of Campinas, São Paulo, Brazil: A comparative study of the critical thought of Sérgio Buarque de Holanda and Manuel de Oliveira Lima.
 María Cristina Redondo, Senior Researcher, National Research Council of Argentina (CONICET): An inquiry into the practical authority of law.
 Silvia Rivas, Video Installation Artist, Buenos Aires, Argentina: Video installation art.
 Mercedes Roffé, Poet, New York City: Poetry.
 Tulio Rojas Curieux, Professor of Anthropology and Ethnolinguistics, and Director, Colombian Center for the Study of Aborigenes Languages (CCELA), University of the Andes, Bogotá: Analysis of complex sentences in Nasa Yuwe.
 María Teresa Ruiz, Professor of Astronomy, University of Chile: The oldest stars.
 Guillermo Saavedra, Poet, Buenos Aires, Argentina; Editor, La Nación, Buenos Aires: Poetry.
 Francisco V. Sepulveda, Professor of Physiology, Center for Scientific Studies, Valdivia, Chile: Molecular identification and regulation of the potassium channel in cell volume control.
 Sol Serrano, Associate Professor of History, Catholic University of Chile: Catholicism and secularization in 19th-century Chile.
 Jorge Daniel Tartarini, Associate Researcher, National Research Council of Argentina (CONICET): The architecture of the Argentine railroads.
 Ana Maria Tavares, Artist, São Paulo: Visual art.
 Alejandro Tortolero Villaseñor, Professor of History, Metropolitan Autonomous University, Iztapalapa, Mexico: Land, society, and ecology in the economy of Mexico, 1780–1940.
 Maurice Vaneau, Theatre Artist, São Paulo, Brazil: Theatre arts.
 Trajano Augusto Ricca Vieira, Professor of Greek Language and Literature, State University of Campinas, São Paulo, Brazil: Translation of The Bacchantes by Euripides.

See also
Guggenheim Fellowship

References

External links
John Simon Guggenheim Memorial Foundation home page

2001
2001 awards
2001 art awards